Nick Charlton (born December 20, 1988) is an American football coach. He is the offensive coordinator at the University of Connecticut. Charlton served as the head football coach of the University of Maine Black Bears from 2019 to 2021, compiling a record of 14–13.

Career
Charlton grew up in Salem, Massachusetts. He earned a B.A. in philosophy from Boston College in 2011 and a M.A. from Boston College's Woods College of Advancing Studies in 2013. During his lone season as Maine's offensive coordinator, the team went to the semifinals of the NCAA FCS Playoffs, the farthest Maine has advanced in team history. Charlton succeeded Joe Harasymiak, who left for an assistant coaching position at the University of Minnesota. Charlton was hired two days after his 30th birthday. Following the 2021 season, it was announced that Charlton would leave Maine to become the offensive coordinator on Jim L. Mora's inaugural staff at UConn.

Head coaching record

References

External links
 Maine profile

1988 births
Living people
Boston College Eagles football coaches
Maine Black Bears football coaches
UConn Huskies football coaches
Sportspeople from Salem, Massachusetts
Sportspeople from Virginia Beach, Virginia
Coaches of American football from Massachusetts
Coaches of American football from Virginia